is a town located in Kamo District, Gifu Prefecture, Japan. , the town had an estimated population of 8,288 and a population density of 36 persons per km2, in 3159 households.

Geography
Shirakawa is in the lower reaches of the Japanese Alps in southern Gifu Prefecture. It lies nestled in valleys formed by several rivers, which combine to form the Shirakawa river at one end of the town. The rivers, though substantially developed and altered, remain a source of Ayu, a sweet river fish.  The low mountains surrounding the town are heavily forested, primarily with evergreen trees. Japanese macaques, bears, and wild boar are known to live in the local forests. The town has a climate characterized by hot and humid summers, and mild winters  (Köppen climate classification Cfa).  The average annual temperature in Shirakawa is 11.4 °C. The average annual rainfall is 2238 mm with September as the wettest month. The temperatures are highest on average in August, at around 24.5 °C, and lowest in January, at around -0.9 °C.

Neighbouring municipalities
Gifu Prefecture
Nakatsugawa
Ena
Gero
Hichisō
Yaotsu
Higashishirakawa

Climate
The town has a climate characterized by hot and humid summers, and mild winters (Köppen climate classification Cfa).

Demographics
Per Japanese census data, the population of Shirakawa has declined steadily over the past 50 years.

History
The area around Shirakawa was part of traditional Mino Province. During the Edo period, it was largely controlled by Owari Domain under the Tokugawa shogunate.  During the post-Meiji restoration cadastral reforms, the area was organised into Mugi District, Gifu. The village of Sakanohigashi was formed on April 1, 1897 with the establishment of the modern municipalities system. In 1953 the hamlet of Nishi-Shirakawa separated out to form the town of Shirakawa and joined Kamo District., and the following year Shirakawa annexed the remainder of Sakanohigashi village.  In 1956, Shirakawa annexed the villages of Kurosawa, Sami, and Sahara.

Economy
The local economy is dominated by forestry and agriculture. Shirakawa is noted for its production of Hinoki wood, and also of green tea.

Education
Shirakawa has five public elementary schools and three public middle schools operated by the town government. The town does not have a high school.

Transportation

Railway 
 Central Japan Railway Company - Takayama Main Line 
 -

Highway

Sister city relations
 - Pistoia, Tuscany, Italy (est. October 30, 1994)
 - Songyuan, Jilin, China, friendship city from 1981

References

External links

Shirakawa official website 

 
Towns in Gifu Prefecture